Copper(II) triflate is the copper(II) salt of trifluoromethanesulfonic acid (known simply as triflic acid) which has a chemical formula of Cu(OSO2CF3)2, abbreviated Cu(OTf)2. This substance, first reported in 1972, is a powerful Lewis acid.  It is used as a catalyst in several organic reactions, such as the Diels–Alder reaction and cyclopropanation reactions (much like rhodium(II) acetate).

References

Copper(II) compounds
Triflates